The Alliance Bank Building is a historic bank building in Alliance, Ohio, listed on the National Register of Historic Places.

History
The Alliance Bank Company was founded in 1872 and operated out of a different three-story building. In 1923, the Alliance Bank Company merged with First National Bank, and architectural firm Walker and Weeks built an addition at the rear of the building and renovated the interior. The bank occupied the first floor, with the five upper floors as commercial office space. The building was listed on the National Register of Historic Places on July 28, 1995.

Architecture
The building is a six-story structure with a three-story addition at the rear with a matching appearance. The building has an Italian Renaissance Revival style. The first floor and exposed basement are faced in sandstone, with the upper floors faced in sandstone-colored brick.

References 

Commercial buildings on the National Register of Historic Places in Ohio
Alliance, Ohio
Buildings and structures in Stark County, Ohio
National Register of Historic Places in Stark County, Ohio